The Republican Party of the United States Virgin Islands is a political party in the U.S. Virgin Islands, and is affiliated with the Republican Party at the national level.

John Canegata was the party chairman until the 2020 Republican National Convention at which the Republican National Committee removed him as chairman for violations of party rules.

Lilliana Belardo de O'Neal, a former member territorial Legislature, and Jevon Williams serve on the Republican National Committee as national committeewoman and national committeeman respectively.

The party has a small influence in the islands, failing to be competitive in gubernatorial elections for over three decades.

History

Founded in 1948 as a committee under the leadership of Roy Gordon, it was the successor to the Republican Club of the Virgin Islands founded by Adolph Achille Gereau in 1924.

Melvin H. Evans, who was the territory's first elected governor, was a Republican. He later served in Congress.

Former Governor Kenneth Mapp had been a Republican member of the Virgin Islands Legislature, but was elected to the territorial governorship as an independent. Previously the lieutenant governor, he was the Republican nominee for Congress in 1996.

Republican National Convention

Under national Republican Party rules, the Virgin Islands sends nine delegates to the Republican National Convention.

See also
 Politics of the United States Virgin Islands
 Republican Party presidential debates, 2012
 Republican Party presidential primaries, 2012
 Results of the 2012 Republican Party presidential primaries

References

External links
Republican Party of the United States Virgin Islands

Political parties in the United States Virgin Islands
1948 establishments in the United States Virgin Islands
Political parties established in 1948